CalAtlantic Group, Inc. was a home construction company based in Arlington, Virginia. In 2018, it was the 4th largest homebuilder in the United States by number of homes closed. It was formed by the October 2015 merger of Standard Pacific Homes and Ryland Homes. In February 2018, the company was acquired by Lennar.

History
Standard Pacific was incorporated in 1961 by Arthur Svendsen and Ronald Foell, and began construction of its first subdivision in 1965. Operations expanded to include San Diego in 1969, Texas in 1978, Arizona in 1998, Colorado in 2000, and Florida in 2002.

On October 1, 2015, Standard Pacific Homes and Ryland Homes merged to form CalAtlantic.

In 2016, Builder Magazine named CalAtlantic its builder of the year.

In June 2017, the company acquired Oakpointe, LLC and entered the Seattle market.

In February 2018, the company was acquired by Lennar.

References

2015 establishments in Virginia
2018 disestablishments in Virginia
2018 mergers and acquisitions
American companies established in 2015
Construction and civil engineering companies of the United States
Companies formerly listed on the New York Stock Exchange
Home builders